Nielebock is a village and a former municipality in the Jerichower Land district, in Saxony-Anhalt, Germany. Since 1 January 2010 it has been part of the town Jerichow.

Former municipalities in Saxony-Anhalt
Jerichow